Christina Covino is an American television soap opera writer.

Positions held
All My Children
 Script Writer (2002-2003)
Breakdown Writer (1996-1997) (Hired by Lorraine Broderick)

As the World Turns
 Script Writer (1995, 1999)
Breakdown Writer (1995-1996; 1998-1999)

Awards and nominations
Daytime Emmy Award
Nomination, 2004, Best Writing, All My Children
Nomination, 2003, Best Writing, All My Children
Nomination, 2000, Best Writing, As the World Turns
Win, 1998, Best Writing, All My Children
Win, 1997, Best Writing, All My Children

Writers Guild of America Award
Win, 2003, Best Writing, All My Children
Nomination, 1998, Best Writing, As the World Turns
Nomination, 1997, Best Writing, All My Children
Win, 1996, Best Writing, All My Children

External links

American soap opera writers
American male television writers
Year of birth missing (living people)
Writers Guild of America Award winners
Living people